Richard Arthur Marchenna (March 17, 1904 – September 2, 1982) was an Old Catholic bishop consecrated by Carmel Henry Carfora as his Suffragan Bishop of Newark with delegated ordinary authority over congregations in New Jersey and New York. He had previously been ordained as a deacon and priest by Carfora. Subsequent to Archbishop Carfora's death in 1958, Marchenna was among at least five of his bishops who claimed to be rightful successors to the primacy of the North American Old Roman Catholic Church.  For several years prior to his death, he made his residence at St. Dominic's Church in Brooklyn, where he died.

References

External links

1904 births
1982 deaths
Presiding Archbishops of the North American Old Catholic Church
American Old Catholic bishops
20th-century American clergy